The United States ice hockey structure includes elements from traditional American scholastic high school and college athletics, affiliated and independent minor leagues, the unique "major junior" leagues, as well as other various amateur junior and youth hockey leagues. The hierarchy of the ice hockey league system forms a pyramid with many regional minor and development leagues making up the base of the pyramid and a linear progression through the professional minor leagues leading to the National Hockey League at the top of the pyramid.

Major league professional hockey

The National Hockey League (NHL) is widely considered to be the premier professional ice hockey league in the world with top players from multiple countries participating in the league. It is one of the Big Four major North American professional sports leagues along with Major League Baseball, the National Basketball Association, and the National Football League. The NHL is a 'closed' league, meaning that teams are neither promoted nor relegated to other leagues, based on a franchise system. There are presently 32 teams in the NHL, with 25 located in the United States and 7 located in Canada. The Stanley Cup, the oldest professional sports trophy in North America, is awarded annually to the league playoff champion at the end of each season.

Minor league professional hockey 

There have been professional ice hockey leagues of varying levels since the invention of the sport, and over time the leagues in North America settled into an unofficial hierarchy. The top of this hierarchy, however, was codified in the most recent NHL Collective Bargaining Agreement. In the top two minor leagues, the American Hockey League and the ECHL, teams act as a development farm system for the major league and the players are represented by the Professional Hockey Players' Association. While players are often sent between major and minor league teams, the teams themselves are never promoted or relegated. As professional leagues, players are paid a salary. As with all minor leagues, the salaries are often much less than what the NHL pays, but in the AHL, compensation is higher than the overall median U.S. annual income, and accounting for room and board, ECHL compensation is comparable to the national average.

Today, the 32 teams of the American Hockey League (AHL) are considered to be the highest-level minor league. All current AHL teams must have affiliation agreements with NHL teams, and many are owned by the same owners as the parent team. Most prospective NHL players will enter into a two-way contract, in which players can be sent between the NHL and AHL teams at will. Many AHL players enter the league after being drafted from juniors or college, or after being scouted and signed by an NHL team and being assigned to the affiliated team to develop as a player. The AHL also recognizes a 'standard contract', which signs a player directly to the AHL though the affiliated NHL team has negotiating rights and can upgrade a player to a two-way contract if they so desire.

The ECHL, formerly known as the East Coast Hockey League, is considered a mid-level minor league with 28 teams, 26 within the United States and two in Canada. Most of the teams of the ECHL have affiliation agreements with NHL and AHL teams, although it is not a requirement and independent ECHL teams can have players from any NHL/AHL team assigned. Generally, players will be promoted to the AHL before moving on the NHL and non-entry-level NHL players must consent to being assigned to the ECHL.

In addition, there are three low-level minor leagues: the Federal Prospects Hockey League (FPHL), the Ligue Nord-Américaine de Hockey (LNAH), and the Southern Professional Hockey League (SPHL). The FPHL has ten teams in the eastern and midwestern United States and considers itself a development league feeding into the AHL, ECHL, and European leagues. The LNAH is based in the Canadian province of Quebec and consists of seven teams. The league has had stipulations that only players from Quebec or who played junior hockey there are eligible and the league boasts many former NHL players. The SPHL is a development league comprising eleven teams in the southeastern and midwestern United States.

International play 

USA Hockey is recognized by the International Olympic Committee and the United States Olympic Committee as the governing body for amateur organized ice hockey in the United States and is a member of the International Ice Hockey Federation. Its mission is to promote the growth of hockey in America and provide the best possible experience for all participants and its programs support and develop players, coaches, officials, and facilities. The United States men's national ice hockey team is based in Colorado Springs, Colorado and is composed of American-born ice hockey players from college through the NHL level. The United States women's national ice hockey team hosts various training camps around the United States and is composed of American-born ice hockey players.

USA Hockey also operates the USA Hockey National Team Development Program, based in Plymouth, Michigan. The program's goal is to prepare student-athletes under the age of 18 for participation on U.S. national teams and continued success throughout their future hockey careers. The NTDP consists of two teams; the U.S. National Under-18 Team, and the U.S. National Under-17 Team. These teams compete in the United States Hockey League in addition to playing NCAA colleges and in international competition.

College hockey 

College ice hockey is ice hockey played between colleges with their teams composed of enrolled students. In the United States, college hockey is played between colleges and universities with the competitive governance structure established by the National Collegiate Athletic Association (NCAA) and the American Collegiate Hockey Association (ACHA).

The National Collegiate Athletic Association has conducted national championships for men's ice hockey since 1948, and women's ice hockey since 2001. U.S. college hockey players must be deemed eligible for NCAA competition by the NCAA Eligibility Center, a process that examines a student-athlete's academic qualifications and amateur status. Players who have participated in major junior ice hockey or any professional hockey league are considered ineligible to play in the NCAA. The NCAA currently has three divisions for ice hockey, Division I, Division II and Division III. Of the three divisions only Division I and Division III have a championship sponsored by the NCAA. The NCAA's top level, Division I, has 59 teams in six conferences: Atlantic Hockey, Big Ten, ECAC Hockey, Hockey East, National Collegiate Hockey Conference, and Western Collegiate Hockey Association. The NCAA Division I Championship is a 16-team, single-elimination tournament, divided into four, 4-team regional tournaments. The winner of each regional advances to the Frozen Four to compete for the national championship. In Division III hockey there are 74 programs in 9 conferences. The current Division III national championship format is an 11-team, single-elimination bracket.

The separate American Collegiate Hockey Association was formed in 1991 and is a chartered non-profit corporation that governs non-varsity or club-varsity college ice hockey in the United States. The organization provides structure and regulations, promotes the quality of play, and sponsors National Awards and National Tournaments. The ACHA's policies cover team and player eligibility, rules of play, ranking procedures, national tournament procedures, and other administrative issues, although the ACHA parallels the NCAA Division III with most eligibility requirements, gameplay rules, etc. The ACHA currently has three men's and two women's divisions and includes approximately 450 teams from across the United States. Teams offer no athletic scholarships and typically receive far less university funding. The ACHA offers an opportunity for college hockey programs that struggle with large budgets and Title IX issues, as an alternative to the NCAA structure. Many schools field separate teams in both the NCAA and ACHA.

Men's U.S. college hockey is a feeder system to the National Hockey League and collegiate athletes who meet eligibility requirements can enter the NHL Draft. As of the 2010–11 season, 30 percent of NHL players (a total of 294) had U.S. college hockey experience prior to turning professional.

Junior and major junior hockey 

Junior hockey is played by athletes between 16 and 20 years old. The leagues are normally organized on a franchise system and can play many more games than are normally played at the high school or college level. Major junior hockey is organized into three leagues run by the Canadian Hockey League: the Ontario Hockey League, Western Hockey League, and Quebec Major Junior Hockey League. Most of these teams are in Canada, but there have also been teams in the American states of New York, Maine, Michigan, Oregon, Pennsylvania and Washington. Major junior players lose NCAA eligibility because they have agents, sign contracts and are given stipends.

Two USA Hockey-sanctioned leagues based in the United States, the Tier I United States Hockey League (USHL) and the Tier II North American Hockey League (NAHL), are run in a similar fashion to the Canadian junior A teams in order for the players to keep NCAA eligibility. Four Hockey Canada junior A leagues have teams in the United States: the British Columbia Hockey League in Washington, the Northern Ontario Junior Hockey League in Michigan, the Ontario Junior Hockey League in New York, and the Superior International Junior Hockey League in Minnesota. Tier III and independent junior leagues typically also consider themselves junior A, but usually utilize a pay-to-play based system that amateur players must pay in order to participate.

The majority of current NHL players came through major junior hockey. For a while, some NHL teams had agreements with amateur teams to help them develop players that would later play professionally, however, this practice was stopped when the NHL expanded in 1967.

High school hockey 
High schools in some states compete in sanctioned ice hockey leagues sponsored by State High School Association while other states compete in leagues not sponsored by their State High School Association. Typically, sponsored leagues exist in regions where ice hockey is traditionally popular, such as the Great Lakes Region (e.g., Minnesota, Michigan, Wisconsin, and Ohio) and the New England Region (e.g., Vermont, Maine, New Hampshire, Massachusetts, Connecticut, and Rhode Island) while non-sponsored leagues typically exist in less traditional ice hockey regions, such as the Southeast Region and Rocky Mountain Region.  However, some exceptions do exist, such as Colorado having a sponsored league and Illinois having a non-sponsored league.

Minor hockey 

Minor hockey in the United States is played below the junior age level (16 years old). Players are classified by age, with each age group playing in its own league. The rules, especially as it relates to body contact, vary from class to class. Unlike most American sports, athletes participate in minor ice hockey as part of clubs as opposed to schools.

References

Ice hockey in the United States
Sports league systems